The 1996 Australian Touring Car season was the 37th year of touring car racing in Australia since the first runnings of the Australian Touring Car Championship and the fore-runner of the present day Bathurst 1000, the Armstrong 500.

Two major touring car categories raced in Australia during 1996, Group 3A Touring Cars and Super Touring. Between them there were 26 touring car race meetings held during 1996; a ten-round series for Group 3A Touring Cars, the 1996 Australian Touring Car Championship (ATCC); an eight-round series for Super Touring, the 1996 Australian Super Touring Championship (ASTC); a two event series in New Zealand, support programme events at the 1996 Australian Grand Prix and 1996 Bartercard Indycar Australia and two stand alone long distance races, nicknamed 'enduros'.

Results and standings

Race calendar
The 1996 Australian touring car season consisted of 26 events.

Australian Touring Car Championship

Formula 1 Super Touring support race
This meeting was a support event of the 1996 Australian Grand Prix.

TAC Touring Cars
This meeting was a support event of the 1996 Australian Grand Prix.

Champ Car Super Touring support race
This meeting was a support event of the 1996 Bartercard Indycar Australia.

EA Sports Touring Cars
This meeting was a support event of the 1996 Bartercard Indycar Australia.

Australian Super Touring Championship

Tickford 500

Bathurst 1000 Super Touring support race
This meeting was a support event of the 1996 AMP Bathurst 1000.

AMP Bathurst 1000

Mobil New Zealand Sprints
This was a two event invitational series held in New Zealand late in 1996. Seven teams (two of them with just a single car) were freighted to New Zealand and held three races at each of two events held at Pukekohe Park Raceway and a Wellington street circuit. Points were allocated 20–16–14–12–10–8–6–4–2–1 for each of the six races.

Australian Touring Car Championship
Supercar seasons
Touring Cars
1996 in V8 Supercars